Jean Jacques Étienne Lucas (28 April 1764 – 6 November 1819) was a French Navy officer, famous for his role in the Battle of Trafalgar.

Career
Born in Marennes, he joined the French Navy at the age of 14. During this period, he fought at the battle off Cape Breton (21 July 1781), part of the American Revolutionary War.

The Battle of Trafalgar

He is primarily remembered for his role in the Battle of Trafalgar. By 1805, Lucas was a capitaine de vaisseau, the French title for captain. He commanded the French ship of the line .

As a result of this positioning, Lucas and his crew found themselves between the two columns of British ships commanded by Nelson and in the heat of battle from very early on in the conflict. They engaged , Nelson's flagship, and through use of heavy artillery they came astern of Victory and sought to board her.

The battle aboard Victory was bloody, costing both sides many lives and ultimately resulting in stalemate. Admiral Nelson himself was mortally wounded by a musket shot fired from atop one of the masts of the Redoutable, but before the boarding was successful,  intervened and opened fire on the starboard side of Redoutable, resulting in the deaths of over two hundred French sailors.

At 2:30 p.m., Redoutable surrendered to Temeraire after having lost 522 men out of their total 643. Of this number, 300 were killed and 222 were wounded. Lucas himself was injured, and the ship had suffered damage which had led to the hold taking on several feet of water. The masts had been broken and there was substantial damage to the rest of the ship, including the artillery.

 sent a party to take Lucas and two other officers off the ship into captivity the following morning. Redoutable, however, was still taking on water, and despite the efforts of rescue boats sent over the course of the day, only 119 crewmen were saved before the ship sank with the dead and wounded still on board.

Lucas was received in England with great courtesy. After his release from capture, he was personally awarded the rank of Commandeur of the Legion of Honour by Napoleon for his role during the battle.

Battle of the Basque Roads

The French squadron was at first blockaded, and then attacked on 11 April 1809 by a British fleet, near Île-d'Aix, in what would become known as the Battle of the Basque Roads.

After breaching the boom that defended the anchored French fleet, the British sent in fireships, Régulus being the first to be hit. The French ship cut its anchor cables and managed to escape from one of the fireships, after a half-hour struggle. Régulus ran aground and it was in danger of capsizing. Trying to save his ship, Lucas had to throw overboard most of his cannons, keeping only 16 of them, together with ammunition and supplies for one month. He managed to refloat his ship, but it ran aground a second time, on the shoals of Les Palles. On 13 April, several smaller British ships tried to destroy the grounded French vessel, as they had done to several others, but after a six-hour fight Lucas repelled them. On 20 April, the British tried again, only to be repulsed a second time. During the next fight, on 24 April, not being able to bear his guns on the enemy because of Régulus ' list, Lucas cut new portholes in the hull for six of his cannons and managed to drive away the British vessels after an 8½ hours fight.

After being grounded for two weeks, repelling four attacks, being bombarded and firing almost 1,400 cannon shots, Régulus was in a bad shape, but on the night of 25 April the British retreated after having destroyed four ships of the line, one frigate and severely damaged the other French ships.

Four days later, on 29 April, Lucas managed to patch and refloat his ship, which entered Rochefort to the cheers of the population.

Later life and death
During the Hundred Days, Lucas sided with Napoleon. After the second Restoration of the Bourbons, Lucas retired from the Navy, in 1816, and died on 6 November 1819, in Brest.

Notes

External links
  File :légion d'honneur on Leonore
 Captain Lucas's report concerning the loss of the vessel Redoutable at the Battle of Trafalgar
 The Redoutable at Trafalgar

French Navy officers
1764 births
1819 deaths
Recipients of the Legion of Honour
French naval commanders of the Napoleonic Wars